The Hume Australian Football Netball League (HFNL), often shortened to Hume Football League, is an Australian rules football and netball competition containing twelve clubs based in the South West Slopes and southern Riverina regions of New South Wales, Australia. The league features four grades in the Australian rules football competition, with these being First-Grade, Reserve-Grade, Under 17s and Under 14s. In the netball competition, there are six grades, with these being A-Grade, B-Grade, C-Grade, C-Reserve Grade, Intermediates and Juniors.

Currently, a home and away season consisting of 18 rounds is played. The best six teams then play-off according to the McIntyre system, culminating in the HFL Grand Final, which is traditionally hosted by Walbundrie.

History
Prior to the formation of the Hume Football League, various football associations and leagues had been organised in the southern Riverina area since the late 19th century, including the Hume Football Association (1922 to 1926), the Central Hume Football Association (1928 - 1934), the Albury & District Football League (1930 to 1957) and the Riverina Main Line Football Association. The latter was organised in 1922 amongst clubs in towns that lay on the railway spur from the main Sydney-Melbourne line at Culcairn as far west as Balldale, as in the years pre-World War II, cars were still a relatively uncommon form of transport, with horses still being prevalent in the area.

Hume Football Association - 1922 to 1926.
There was an original Hume Football Association that was formed in 1922 and ran from 1922 to 1926 during its short history.
Premiers / Runners Up
1922 - Bulgandra: 8.12 - 60 defeated Walla Walla: 6.4 - 40. Other teams were - Brocklesby, Burrumbuttock and Walbundrie.
1923 - Burrumbuttock: 6.8 - 38 d Brocklesby: 6.5 - 35. Other teams were - Bulgandra, Walbundrie and Walla Walla. Brocklesby & Walla Walla joined the Riverina Main Line Football Association in 1924. 
1924 - Bulgandra d Burrumbuttock. Other teams were - Walbundrie and Walla Walla Sub Division (Ramblers). The Walla Walla Subdivision FC joined the Riverina Main Line Football Association in 1925. Burrumbuttock joined the Albury B. Grade Football Association in 1925.
1925 - The Hume FA had an AGM in March, 1925 with three club's, Bulgandra, Rand and Walbundrie interested in playing, but it appears the Hume FA went into recess in 1925.
1926 - Rand: 10.3 - 64 d Bulgandra: 4.6 - 30. Other teams were - Burrumbuttock and Walbundrie. Burrumbuttock joined the Albury & Border FA & Rand joined the Osborne FA in 1927, while Bulgandra and Walbundrie were forced to go into recess for 1927, as Walbundrie were refused entry into the Albury & Border FA. Bulgandra and Walbundrie then joined the Central Hume FA in 1928.

Appropriately, it was over concerns about travel times that caused the formation of the Hume Football League. The league was formed in 1933 by Jindera, Lavington, Gerogery and Border United (from Albury), who were disgruntled about the amount of travel required in the existing Central Hume Football Association. Gerogery won the inaugural season, winning the deciding Grand Final against Jindera.

In 1934, Border United withdrew after one season to be replaced by Bethanga, and Gerogery won their second premiership in a Grand Final against Lavington. In 1935, Walla Walla, Walbundrie and Burrumbuttock joined from the Central Hume Football Association, which was then dissolved.

The league's roster was relatively unstable in early years as clubs transferred from one local league to another, formed or disbanded.
1936: Wagga Road joined.
1939: Wagga Road and Bethanga left.
1940: Lavington withdrew.
1941–1944: Recess due to World War II.

1938 Bloodbath Grand Final

The Hume Football League Grand Final was held at Jindera on 3 September 1938. Bethanga's Captain Jack Mortlock and player Jim Stapleton were felled behind play in the first quarter and sent to hospital. Back then teams only had 19 players with just one interchange player so that left Bethanga with 17 fit players for the remainder of the match. The umpire was threatened and intimidated by the Lavington players so he made no reports during the grand final and they went on to record an easy win. Some of the Lavington players were disgusted with the way some of their teammates behaved and were disillusioned with their victory.

Post-War
The league reconvened in 1945 towards the end of the war with the following clubs: Balldale, Brocklesby, Rand, Walbundrie and Walla Walla. As before, the league's membership continued to fluctuate in subsequent years.

1946: Gerogery and Jindera reformed and joined, Balldale moved to the Chiltern & District Football Association
1947: Balldale returned, Burrumbuttock reformed. Mr. Kelly Joseph Azzi, Balldale Football Club President and Delegate first donated the Azzi Medal in 1947 for the fairest and best player award 
1948: Gerogery disbanded, East Albury Rovers joined.
1949: East Albury Rovers left, North Albury Seconds joined.
1953: North Albury Seconds left, Howlong joined from Chiltern & District Football Association.

After the admission of Howlong, the make-up of the league remained stable until 1970 when Boree Creek joined from the Coreen & District Football League and Osborne joined from the Central Riverina Football League (the precursor to the Riverina Football League). At this point the competition had ten teams.

Balldale disbanded in February, 1975, causing a bye. In 1975, Lavington fielded a team in the Hume Football League, in addition to the Tallangatta & District Football League, for two years. In 1976, a reserves competition was introduced and Boree Creek moved back to the Coreen & District Football League. After two seasons, the Lavington side moved to the Farrer Football League in 1977 (to later join the Ovens & Murray Football League in 1979), with a new club, East Lavington, taking their place.

Modern Era
Since the 1970s and 1980s, increased mobility has meant that the original motivations behind the league's formation have lessened, and the league has taken in more teams from beyond its original domain, to cover more of the rural area between the regional cities of Albury and Wagga Wagga. Henty joined the Hume Football League in 1980, and Lockhart joined in 1982, both from the Farrer Football League. Rand moved to the Coreen & District Football League in 1983. Culcairn and Holbrook joined the league from the Tallangatta & District Football League in 1992 and 1999 respectively. East Lavington disbanded at the end of 1997.

At the same time, economic concerns and the effect of migration from rural areas on the number of participants, leading to difficulties fielding teams, has meant that clubs from smaller neighbouring towns are electing to merge rather than disband completely, thus in 2006 two merged entities competed for the first time, the Brocklesby Burrumbuttock Football Club and the Rand Walbundrie Football Club.

In recent years on the playing arena, Osborne has tended to dominate the competition, though the league remains fairly competitive with most clubs providing a challenge.

Due to the disbanding of the neighbouring Coreen & District Football League, most of its teams were moved to the Hume Football League, bringing the number to fifteen for the 2008 season; these were Billabong Crows (a merger of the former Urana and Oaklands Football Clubs), Coleambally, Coreen-Daysdale-Hopefield-Buraja United (CDHBU), Murray Magpies and Rennie. Rennie retained the "Hoppers" nickname, sharing it with Walla Walla.

With the increasing size of the competition, an initial proposal to split the league into two pools for the 2009 season, organised geographically into western and eastern divisions and possibly including other nearby clubs was tabled in July 2007. This may be considered as part of an overall independent review of Australian football in the Riverina.

Rennie moved to the Picola & District Football League in 2009.

Coleambally moved to the Farrer Football League in 2011.

During the 2015/16 off season both the Walla Hoppers and Rand-Walbundrie Tigers football clubs entered merger talks for 2016 Hume Football League season. Voting for the proposed merger took place on Monday 7 March (2016). Walla Walla Hoppers members voted 100 per cent in favour of the joint venture; while The Rand-Walbundrie Tigers voted 83 per cent in favour. The merged club commenced in 2016 playing home matches at Rand.

Current finals system
The HFL & HNA currently uses the "McIntyre system". The final series is played over four weekends, with the grand final traditionally being played on the third Saturday of September. Traditionally since 1976 all finals for both fotball and netball have been played at the Walbundrie Showground. Since then the only finals to be played elsewhere were the 1989 Grand Final at East Lavington, 2019 Minor Semi-final at Urana Road Oval & 2022 Minor Semi-final at Howlong Sportsground.

2022 Finals Series

Current clubs

Former Clubs

Premierships: Football

Seniors

 1933: Gerogery
 1934: Gerogery
 1935: Gerogery
 1936: Gerogery
 1937: Walbundrie
 1938: Lavington 
 1939: Walla Walla 
 1940: Walla Walla
 1941: Recess - World War II
 1942: Recess - World War II
 1943: Recess - World War II
 1944: Recess - World War II
 1945: Rand
 1946: Jindera
 1947: Walbundrie
 1948: Walla Walla
 1949: Walbundrie
 1950: Brocklesby 
 1951: Burrumbuttock 
 1952: Walbundrie
 1953: Walla Walla
 1954: Howlong
 1955: Jindera
 1956: Jindera
 1957: Jindera
 1958: Brocklesby
 1959: Walla Walla
 1960: Jindera
 1961: Jindera
 1962: Balldale
 1963: Jindera
 1964: Jindera
 1965: Walla Walla
 1966: Walla Walla
 1967: Walbundrie
 1968: Walbundrie
 1969: Burrumbuttock
 1970: Walla Walla
 1971: Howlong
 1972: Balldale
 1973: Walla Walla
 1974: Walla Walla
 1975: Jindera
 1976: Walla Walla
 1977: Howlong
 1978: Walbundrie
 1979: East Lavington
 1980: Walla Walla
 1981: Walla Walla
 1982: Lockhart
 1983: Walla Walla
 1984: Henty
 1985: Osborne
 1986: Henty
 1987: Walla Walla
 1988: East Lavington
 1989: Walbundrie
 1990: Henty
 1991: Osborne
 1992: Osborne
 1993: Culcairn
 1994: Osborne
 1995: Osborne
 1996: Henty
 1997: Howlong
 1998: Osborne
 1999: Osborne
 2000: Osborne
 2001: Osborne
 2002: Howlong
 2003: Lockhart
 2004: Holbrock
 2005: Osborne
 2006: Osborne
 2007: Culcairn
 2008: Jindera
 2009: Osborne
 2010: Howlong
 2011: Jindera 
 2012: Osborne
 2013: Brocklesby-Burrumbuttock
 2014: Henty
 2015: Brocklesby-Burrumbuttock
 2016: Brocklesby-Burrumbuttock
 2017: Osborne
 2018: Brocklesby-Burrumbuttock
 2019: Osborne
 2020: N/A
 2021: N/A
 2022: Holbrook

Reserves

 1976: Jindera
 1977: East Lavington
 1978: East Lavington
 1979: Walla Walla
 1980: Walbundrie
 1981: Henty
 1982: Jindera
 1983: Brocklesby
 1984: East Lavington
 1985: Jindera
 1986: Henty
 1987: Jindera
 1988: East Lavington
 1989: East Lavington 
 1990: East Lavington
 1991: Walbundrie
 1992: Walla Walla
 1993: Culcairn
 1994: Walla Walla
 1995: Burrumbuttock
 1996: Culcairn
 1997: Walla Walla
 1998: Osborne
 1999: Lockhart
 2000: Holbrook
 2001: Jindera
 2002: Osborne
 2003: Osborne
 2004: Osborne
 2005: Osborne
 2006: Lockhart
 2007: Osborne
 2008: Osborne
 2009: Culcairn
 2010: Culcairn
 2011: Jindera
 2012: Howlong
 2013: Jindera
 2014: Brocklesby-Burrumbuttock
 2015: Henty
 2016: Osborne
 2017: Jindera
 2018: Rand-Walbundrie-Walla
 2019: Brocklesby-Burrumbuttock
 2020: N/A
 2021: N/A
 2022: Holbrook

Juniors: 1950-1975 / Thirds

 1950: St Paul's College
 1951: Walla Walla
 1952: Walla Walla
 1953: Walla Walla
 1954: Howlong
 1955: Howlong
 1956: Howlong
 1957: Howlong
 1958: Howlong 
 1959: Howlong
 1960: Jindera
 1961: St Paul's College
 1962: Corowa
 1963: St Paul's College
 1964: Walla Walla
 1965: Walla Walla
 1966: Rand
 1967: St Paul's College
 1968: Walbundrie
 1969: Jindera
 1970: Walla Walla
 1971: Walla Walla
 1972: St. Paul's College
 1973: Walla Walla
 1974: Walla Walla
 1975: St. Paul's College
 1976: St. Paul's College
 1977: East Lavington
 1978: St. Paul's College
 1979: Wabundrie
 1980: Henty
 1981: Henty
 1982: Henty
 1983: Henty
 1984: Walla Walla
 1985: Osborne
 1986: Henty
 1987: Osborne
 1988: Walla Walla
 1989: Walla Walla
 1990: Walla Walla
 1991: Walla Walla
 1992: Henty
 1993: Lockhart
 1994: Lockhart
 1995: Walla Walla
 1996: Walla Walla
 1997: Walla Walla
 1998: Walla Walla
 1999: Howlong
 2000: Culcairn
 2001: Henty
 2002: Henty
 2003: Henty
 2004: Henty
 2005: Osborne
 2006: Culcairn
 2007: Culcairn
 2008: Murray Magpies
 2009: Jindera
 2010: Holbrook
 2011: Brocklesby-Burrumbuttock 
 2012: Rand-Walbundrie
 2013: Osborne
 2014: Osborne
 2015: Osborne
 2016: Henty
 2017: Brocklesby-Burrumbuttock
 2018: Osborne 
 2019: Holbrook
 2020: N/A
 2021: N/A
 2022: Rand-Walbundrie-Walla

Fourths

 1990: Lockhart
 1991: Lockhart
 1992: Lockhart
 1993: Walbundrie
 1994: Walla Walla
 1995: Walla Walla
 1996: Osborne
 1997: Osborne
 1998: Brocklesby
 1999: Holbrook
 2000: Lockhart
 2001: Henty
 2002: Lockhart
 2003: Osborne
 2004: Howlong
 2005: Holbrook
 2006: Henty
 2007: Holbrook
 2008: Holbrook
 2009: Howlong
 2010: Rand-Walbundrie 
 2011: Osborne
 2012: Osborne
 2013: Osborne
 2014: Coreen-Daysdale-Hopefield-Buraja United
 2015: Henty
 2016: Holbrook
 2017: Osborne
 2018: Rand-Walbundrie-Walla
 2019: Osborne
 2020: N/A
 2021: N/A
 2022: Henty

Players
Footballers from the HFL who currently play or have played in the AFL include:
 Tony Armstrong (Brocklesby-Burrumbuttock)
 Sam Schulz & Jeremy Finlayson (Culcairn)
 Anthony Miles (Howlong)
 Adam Schneider (Osborne)
 Dean Terlich (Osborne)
 Sam Rowe (Walla Walla)
 Nick Murray (Henty)

See also
AFL NSW/ACT
Australian rules football in New South Wales
Coreen & District Football League
Farrer Football League
Group 9 Rugby League
Group 13 Rugby League
Ovens & Murray Football League
Picola & District Football League
Tallangatta & District Football League

Sources
Wegener, Leon (editor) Walla Walla Football Club 1903–1978 (1978)

References

External links
 
Central Hume Football Association: 1928 - 1934
1938 - Hume FL semi final team photo: Walbundrie FC 
1938 - Hume FL Premiers - Lavington FC team photo
1939 - Hume FL team photos of Burrumbuttock FC & Jindera FC
1939 - Hume FL second semi final winners: Walla Walla FC team photo
1939 - Hume FL grand final team photos: Walla Walla FC & Lavington FC
1940 - Hume FL Rep team photo
1946 - Walbundrie Knock-out Competition: Chiltern / Barnawartha team & Lavington FC team photos
1946 - Hume FL: 1st semi final teams: Gerogery FC & Walla Walla FC team photos
1947 - Hume FL: Walla Walla FC team photo
1947 - Hume FL: Walbundrie FC team photo
1948 - Hume FL: Balldale FC team photo
1948 - Hume FL: East Albury FC team photo
1949 - Hume FL Best & Fairest / Azzi Medalist: Doug Probyn, Brocklesby FC
1949 - Hume FL Premiers: Walbundrie FC team photo

1933 establishments in Australia
Sports leagues established in 1933
Australian rules football competitions in New South Wales
Sport in the Riverina